Tracy Austin defeated the four-time defending champion Chris Evert in the final, 6–4, 6–3 to win the women's singles tennis title at the 1979 US Open. Austin became the youngest US Open champion in the Open Era, aged 16 years and 9 months.

Seeds
The seeded players are listed below. Tracy Austin is the champion; others show the round in which they were eliminated.

  Chris Evert-Lloyd (runner-up)
  Martina Navratilova (semifinalist)
  Tracy Austin (champion)
  Virginia Wade (quarterfinalist)
  Evonne Goolagong (quarterfinalist)
  Dianne Fromholtz (fourth round)
  Wendy Turnbull (third round)
  Kerry Melville Reid (quarterfinalist)
  Billie Jean King (semifinalist)
  Greer Stevens (fourth round)
  Kathy Jordan (fourth round)
  Regina Maršíková (fourth round)
  Sue Barker (second round)
  Pam Shriver (first round)
  Ann Kiyomura (second round)
  Betty Stöve (second round)

Qualifying

Draw

Key
 Q = Qualifier
 WC = Wild card
 LL = Lucky loser
 r = Retired

Finals

Earlier rounds

Section 1

Section 2

Section 3

Section 4

Section 5

Section 6

Section 7

Section 8

External links
1979 US Open – Women's draws and results at the International Tennis Federation

Women's Singles
US Open (tennis) by year – Women's singles
1979 in women's tennis
1979 in American women's sports